Naelee Rae (born August 25, 1996) is an American actress and singer-songwriter. She is known for her role as the speaking voice of Tasha on Nickelodeon's "The Backyardigans", her starring acting roles include Maddie Hakansovich on the 2006 ABC TV pilot Drift, and she played the role of Allison in Loverboy.

Filmography
Law & Order: Criminal Intent (1 episode, 2002) (TV): Molly Rowan
The Practice (1 episode, 2003) (TV): Ashley Markham
Loverboy (2005): Allison (6 years old)
The Notorious Bettie Page (2005): Young Love
Drift (2006 TV pilot) (2006) (TV): Maddie Hakansovich
The Saint of the Zuiderzee (2007): Mary Clare
The Backyardigans (28 episodes, 2004–2007) (TV): Tasha (voice)
The Guiding Light (4 episodes, 2008–2009) (TV): Clarissa Marler

References

External links 
 

1996 births
American child actresses
American voice actresses
American film actresses
Living people
American television actresses
People from Boyertown, Pennsylvania
21st-century American women